Everywhere We Go is the fifth studio album by American country music singer Kenny Chesney. It was released on March 2, 1999 via BNA Records. The first in his career to be certified double platinum for sales of two million copies, it produced four singles with "How Forever Feels", "You Had Me from Hello", "She Thinks My Tractor's Sexy", and "What I Need to Do". The first two singles were Number One hits on the Billboard country charts and were also Kenny's first Top 40 hits on the US Billboard Hot 100 chart, "She Thinks My Tractor's Sexy" was a number 11 hit on that same chart, and "What I Need to Do" a number eight. The singles "You Had Me from Hello" and "She Thinks My Tractor's Sexy" were both certified gold by the Recording Industry Association of America (RIAA). This was Chesney's first album to feature a crossover-friendly country-pop sound, which was a departure from his earlier neotraditional country albums.

Track listing

Personnel
As listed in liner notes.

 Eddie Bayers – drums
 Wyatt Beard – background vocals 
 Shannon Brown – background vocals 
 Larry Byrom – acoustic guitar
 Buddy Cannon – bass guitar, background vocals 
 Kenny Chesney – acoustic guitar, lead vocals
 J. T. Corenflos – electric guitar
 Dan Dugmore – steel guitar
 Larry Franklin – fiddle, mandolin
 Sonny Garrish – steel guitar
 Steve Gibson – electric guitar, six string bass
 Rob Hajacos – fiddle

 John Hobbs – piano
 Rick Holt – Dobro
 Paul Leim – drums
 B. James Lowry – electric guitar, acoustic guitar, gut string guitar
 Randy McCormick – synthesizer
 Liana Manis – background vocals 
 Brent Mason – electric guitar
 Steve Nathan – piano, synthesizer
 Louis Dean Nunley – background vocals 
 Bobby Ogdin – piano, synthesizer

 Sean Paddock – drums
 Larry Paxton – bass guitar
 Gary Prim – piano
 Melonie Cannon – background vocals
 John Wesley Ryles – background vocals
 Randy Travis – duet vocals on "Baptism"
 Cindy Richardson-Walker – background vocals 
 Bergen White – background vocals
 Kristin Wilkinson – string arrangements & conductor
 Dennis Wilson – background vocals
 Curtis "Mr. Harmony" Young – background vocals 

Strings contracted by the Nashville String Machine, Carl Gorodetzky

Charts

Weekly charts

Year-end charts

Singles

Certifications

References

1999 albums
Kenny Chesney albums
BNA Records albums
Albums produced by Buddy Cannon
Albums produced by Norro Wilson